Porte de La Chapelle Arena (also known by its project name Paris Arena II and its trade name Adidas Arena) is a future multipurpose and modular hall located in the Chapelle district in Paris (18th arrondissement). The hall will have a capacity of 8,000 seats for sporting events and 9,000 seats for concerts and shows. It is expected to be delivered in the summer of 2023. It was originally intended to host the wrestling events and men's preliminary basketball tournament of the 2024 Summer Olympics, before hosting the Paralympic table tennis tournament. Finally, the Olympic events of badminton then rhythmic gymnastics take place there, followed by para badminton and athletic strength. As soon as the arena is built, it will become the residence of Paris Basketball, as well as PSG Handball for its large games.

References

External links

2023 establishments in France
Venues of the 2024 Summer Olympics
Basketball venues in France
Covered stadiums
Olympic gymnastics venues
Music venues in France
Music venues in Paris
Music venues completed in 2023
Sports venues completed in 2023
Sports venues in Seine-Saint-Denis
Sports venues in Paris
21st-century architecture in France